Podocarpus lophatus is a species of conifer in the family Podocarpaceae. It is found only in the Philippines. It is threatened by habitat loss.

References

lophatus
Vulnerable plants
Taxonomy articles created by Polbot
Taxa named by David John de Laubenfels